The Jackson State Tigers basketball team is the men's basketball team that represents Jackson State University in Jackson, Mississippi, United States. The team competes in the Southwestern Athletic Conference. The team last played in the NCAA Division I men's basketball tournament in 2007. The Tigers are coached by Mo Williams.

Conference Championships 
The Tigers have appeared in the NCAA Division I Tournament three times, and the NCAA Division II Tournament five times. They are the only team to ever forfeit a game in Division II tournament history. The Tigers were the first team to win the SWAC Tournament, in 1978. Due to not having an automatic bid, the Tigers did not go to the Division I tournament in 1978 or 1991, the last time the SWAC has not sent a team to the tournament.

Postseason results

NCAA Division I tournament results
The Tigers have appeared in the NCAA Division I Tournament three times. Their combined record is 0–3. Of the SWAC teams who have appeared in the Division I tournament, they are the only team to have never played an opening round game.

NCAA Division II tournament results
The Tigers have appeared in the NCAA Division II Tournament five times. Their combined record is 4–6. They are the only team to ever forfeit a game in tournament history.

† - Jackson State, citing policy of the Mississippi Board of Trustees, was compelled to withdraw from the tournament rather than competing in an interracial contest. This would be the only time such an occurrence would directly mar the tournament, and Jackson State themselves would return to the tournament in 1964.

NIT results
The Tigers have appeared in two National Invitation Tournaments (NIT). Their combined record is 1–2.

CIT results
The Tigers have played in one CollegeInsider.com Postseason Tournament (CIT). Their record is 1–1.

Tigers in the NBA
Cleveland Buckner
A. W. Holt
Lindsey Hunter
McCoy Ingram
Ryan Lorthridge
Ed Manning
Audie Norris
Sylvester Norris
Gene Short
Purvis Short
Henry Ward
Cornell Warner
Dwayne Whitfield
Trey Johnson

Notes

External links 
 Official website

 
1950 establishments in Mississippi
Basketball teams established in 1950